The Admiral Grigorovich-class, also referred to as Krivak V class, Russian designation Project 11356R, is a class of frigates built by the Yantar Shipyard in Kaliningrad for the Russian Navy and Indian Navy, with a cost of $450-500 million.

History
By 2010–2011, it was decided the Russian Navy will procure six vessels based on the proven  design, mainly due to repeated delays with production of Admiral Gorshkov frigates and because of the urgent need for new frigates necessary for modernization of the Black Sea Fleet. The Yantar Shipyard won the contract for construction of the frigates and three vessels were to be completed in four years. Previously, six ships of the same design, known as Talwar class, were built for the Indian Navy between 1999 and 2011 by the Baltic Shipyard, Saint Petersburg and Yantar Shipyard, Kaliningrad.

The lead ship, was laid down on 18 December 2010 and was commissioned on 11 March 2016.

Initially, Ukrainian state-owned enterprise Zorya-Mashproekt was providing gas turbines for the Russian frigates, but after the start of the Russo-Ukrainian War, Ukraine said it would no longer supply the engines. Instead, Russian manufacturer Saturn was asked to supply alternative M90FR gas turbines.

Since October 2016, it was claimed the three incomplete frigates, Admiral Butakov, Admiral Istomin and Admiral Kornilov, that construction was suspended in 2015 due to Ukraine's refusal to supply gas turbine power plants, are considered to be sold to India. The Russian Navy has opposed this export.

On 1 June 2017, the United Shipbuilding Corporation (USC) announced that it would resume construction of the last three frigates in 2018 and that the ships would later join the Russian Navy. The decision to resume the work was made following the preliminary testing of latest Russian gas turbine engines, the M70FRU (14 MW) and M90FR (20 MW, maximal 25-28 MW), designed and built by NPO Saturn plant. With an access to alternative power plants, the ships were believed to remain in Russian service. In December 2017, NPO Saturn has successfully completed three R&D projects of the M90FR, Agregat-DKVP and M70FRU-R gas engines held since 2014.

However, on 20 October 2018, a decision was made to sell the unfinished frigates Admiral Butakov and Admiral Istomin to the Indian Navy under a contract worth US$950 million. The Yantar Shipyard in Kaliningrad will carry all necessary works to finish the frigates, before they will be handed over to India in first half of 2024. As of 2021, it had still to be confirmed whether Admiral Kornilov would be completed for the Russian Navy or potentially sold to a foreign customer. Later in 2021 it was reported that she would in fact be sold to a foreign customer.

On 17 August 2022, deputy head of United Shipbuilding Corporation Vladimir Korolev stated that the Yantar Shipyard is ready to build more Admiral Grigorovich-class frigates. He also stated that the fate of the sixth, incomplete frigate, Admiral Kornilov, has not yet been decided.

Operational history
On 3 November 2016, as part of Russian military intervention in the Syrian Civil War, Admiral Grigorivich was deployed to the Mediterranean Sea for the first time. On 15 November 2016, it launched Kalibr cruise missiles on IS and Al-Nusra targets in Syria's Idlib and Homs provinces, destroying ammunition warehouses, gathering and training centers and weapon production plants.
Admiral Grigorovich was redeployed to the Mediterranean Sea in April 2017, following the US missile strikes against Syria. She joined the Mediterranean squadron again on 24 December 2020.

On 12 April 2022, a Grigorovich-class frigate reportedly shot down a Bayraktar TB2 drone during the 2022 Russian invasion of Ukraine. On 22 April a Grigorovich-class frigate reportedly fired Kalibr cruise missiles against Ukrainian targets.

Export
As part of the deal signed on 20 October 2018 for delivery of Admiral Butakov and Admiral Istomin frigates to the Indian Navy, Rosoboronexport and Goa Shipyard have signed an additional contract for two more Admiral Grigorovich-class frigates to be license-built at Goa Shipyard in India. Under the contract, Russia will provide India the technological know-how to build the frigates on its own. The final cost for the two vessels is yet to be determined, but was estimated at US$500 million. The Indian Navy should receive the ships in 2026 and 2027, respectively.

Ships

See also
List of ships of the Soviet Navy
List of ships of Russia by project number
Admiral Gorshkov-class frigate

References

External links

 
 All Admiral Grigorovich Class Frigates - Complete Ship List

Frigate classes